During most of the Middle Ages (c. 410–1485 AD), the island of Great Britain was divided into several kingdoms. The following articles address this period of history in each of the major kingdoms:
England in the Middle Ages
Anglo-Saxon England (600–1066)
England in the High Middle Ages (1066–c. 1216)
England in the Late Middle Ages (c. 1216–1485)
Scotland in the Middle Ages
Scotland in the Early Middle Ages (400–900)
Scotland in the High Middle Ages (900–1286)
Scotland in the Late Middle Ages (1286–1513)
Wales in the Middle Ages
Wales in the Early Middle Ages (c. 383–c. 825)
Wales in the High Middle Ages (c. 825–1282)
Wales in the Late Middle Ages (1282–1542)

Middle Ages
Middle Ages by country